Yaare Koogadali is a 2012 Indian Kannada-language action film written and directed by Samuthirakani, starring Puneeth Rajkumar and Bhavana. Parvathamma Rajkumar and Raghavendra Rajkumar are producing the film under for Poornima Enterprises. The film is a remake of Samuthirakani's Tamil film Poraali (2011).

Movie Completes 50-days run 49 centre in Karnataka.

Plot 
The story begins on a rainy night when Kumara (Puneeth Rajkumar) and Natesha (Yogesh) escape from NIMHANS and enter Bangalore with their past actions unclear. They settle at Shishupala's (Sadhu Kokila) residence and find jobs in a petrol bunk. Bharathi (Bhavana) comes into Kumara's life. Her initial wrong belief about him changes as soon as she knows his kind heartedness when she saw him help people in need (including her). She pursues him to be his girlfriend but he is not interested and warns her away due to his lifestyle. However, the residents of his neighborhood convince him that she loves him and is a good girl. He accepts her. Soon, love blooms between them. Kumara, along with his friends, starts a venture where customers can call and order a product such as groceries and the friends would buy and deliver them at a service charge. While distributing their venture's ads, they narrowly escape being spotted by a van with goondas spearheaded by Ravishankar who are in search of Kumara and Natesha. Soon, their business grows well. This makes Shishupala give an advertisement about their venture in a magazine with their photo. But due to the advertisement, the goons come to their store to attack them. Within a few minutes, a childhood friend of Kumara, arrives in Bangalore and shares some news.

The goons convince everyone in Kumara's neighborhood that he's gone mad and is not mentally sound.  Kumara's old life is shown in the second half, and it is revealed that he is persuaded to be mentally ill because of his father and stepmother's desire for wealth. His mother, who also happens to be his father's first wife is mentally sound and healthy but suffers due to her husband who is behind another woman and marries her. They frame Kumara's mother by saying she's mentally unsound. The film comes to an end after Kumara decides that he's had enough running away from the goons and decides to hit them back.

Cast 

 Puneeth Rajkumar as Kumara
 Bhavana as Bharathi
 Yogesh as Natesha
 Sindhu Lokanath as Kasturi
 Girish Karnad
 Nivedhitha
 Sadhu Kokila as Shishupala
 P. Ravi Shankar
 Malavika Avinash
 Rakesh Adiga
 Shobaraj
 Achyuth Kumar Gandhi
 Mico Nagaraj
 Danny Kuttappa
 Hulivan Gangadharaiah
 Charmy Kaur as an item number "Hello 123 Testing"

Production 
Yaare Koogadali began filming in June 2012 at Rajkumar's residence. V. Ravichandran made the first clap for a scene. Initially, actress Sameera Reddy was considered for and signed for the lead role, but she was later replaced by Bhavana.
The film title is inspired from an old song "Yaare Koogadali Oore Horadali" from the film Sampathige Savaal which featured Puneeth's father Rajkumar in the lead role. The houses of hero and heroine were built in an open terrace by art director Jacki.

Release 
The Central Board of Film Certification rated it U/A. The film opened on 20 December 2012 all over the state.

Soundtrack 

Popular composer V. Harikrishna scored the songs and soundtrack. Director Yogaraj Bhat wrote the lyrics for one song while the rest were written by Dr. V Nagendra Prasad.

Reception

Critical response 

A critic from The Times of India scored the film at 3.5 out of 5 stars and says "Girish Karnad impresses with his small but important role as a doctor. Music by V Harikrishna has some catchy tunes. Cinematography by M Sukumaran is amazing". Srikanth Srinivasa from Rediff.com scored the film at 3 out of 5 stars and wrote "Harikrishna's background score is breezy and the film doesn't bore the viewer with unwanted songs. This movie is a neat family entertainer and worth a watch". A critic from NDTV wrote  "Sukumar's camera work is excellent, while Guru Prasad's dialogues are funny and precise. Overall, it is an enjoyable film, which offers a lot of variety of entertainment". Shruti I L from DNA wrote "Yes, there could have been less bloodshed and better music. Actors like Achyutha and Rakesh should also have been put to better use and the second half could have been crisper. But don’t make these your reasons to not watch the film". A critic from Bangalore Mirror wrote  "The background music is loud and hampers a decent sleep while watching the film. The camerawork is better than most other aspects of the film. Sukadhare’s break from filmmaking has not worked for him or the audience".

Awards

References

External links 
 

2010s buddy films
2010s Kannada-language films
2012 action films
2012 films
Films directed by Samuthirakani
Films scored by V. Harikrishna
Films set in Bangalore
Films set in Karnataka
Films set in psychiatric hospitals
Films shot in Bangalore
Indian action thriller films
Indian buddy films
Kannada remakes of Tamil films